Parkline is an unincorporated census-designated place on the Coeur d'Alene Reservation in Benewah County, Idaho, United States. The population was 80 at the 2010 census. Parkline was a city until it disincorporated in 2001.

Geography
Parkline is located at  (47.337740, -116.686524).

Demographics

As of the census of 2000, there were 65 people, 31 households, and 22 families residing in the city. The racial makeup of the city was 93.85% White, 1.54% Native American, 3.08% from other races, and 1.54% from two or more races. Hispanic or Latino of any race were 3.08% of the population.

There were 31 households, out of which 22.6% had children under the age of 18 living with them, 61.3% were married couples living together, 6.5% had a female householder with no husband present, and 29.0% were non-families. 29.0% of all households were made up of individuals, and 9.7% had someone living alone who was 65 years of age or older. The average household size was 2.10 and the average family size was 2.55.

In the city the population was spread out, with 18.5% under the age of 18, 12.3% from 18 to 24, 20.0% from 25 to 44, 24.6% from 45 to 64, and 24.6% who were 65 years of age or older. The median age was 42 years. For every 100 females, there were 97.0 males. For every 100 females age 18 and over, there were 130.4 males.

The median income for a household in the city was $40,000, and the median income for a family was $40,000. Males had a median income of $51,250 versus $14,583 for females. The per capita income for the city was $31,309. There were 11.5% of families and 8.9% of the population living below the poverty line, including 11.1% of under eighteens and none of those over 64.

References

Census-designated places in Benewah County, Idaho
Former municipalities in Idaho
Populated places disestablished in 2001
Census-designated places in Idaho